Ketan Anand is an Indian film director. He is son of film-maker Chetan Anand and actress Uma Anand. He is the cousin of director Shekhar Kapur. 

He has directed the movies Toote Khilone and Shart and was associate producer of Heer Raanjha

Personal life
In early years of his life, Ketan and his brother Vivek Anand were featured in a song alongside Dev Anand and Sheila Ramani from the movie Funtoosh.  Watching his father make films, Ketan decided to forgo administration as his major and concentrated on theater. He graduated from St. Stephen's College, Delhi. He co-authored the book Chetan Anand: The Poetics of Film with his mother.

In 2008, Ketan Anand is all set to revive his father, Chetan Anand's banner Himalaya Films with a psychological love story titled Petrol Pump. This movie was written some 30–40 years ago by his father Chetan Anand who had wanted to direct the film himself with Raaj Kumar and Rajesh Khanna in the lead. But things didn't work out. The script was his last gift to his son when he died. Ketan will be launching his cousin Vaibhav Anand in the movie.

He, along with his brother Vivek Anand and two employees, was convicted of murdering the actress Priya Rajvansh in 2000 and was sentenced to life imprisonment in July 2002. They were granted bail in November 2002 and got away with the murder.

Filmography

 Aaja Meri Jaan (1993)
 Shart (1986)
 Hum Rahe Na Hum (1984) 
 Toote Khilone (1978)

References

Hindi-language film directors
Living people
Year of birth missing (living people)
Place of birth missing (living people)